Beeley is a civil parish in the Derbyshire Dales district of Derbyshire, England.  The parish contains 20 listed buildings that are recorded in the National Heritage List for England.  Of these, three are listed at Grade II*, the middle of the three grades, and the others are at Grade II, the lowest grade. The parish contains the village of Beeley and the surrounding countryside and moorland, mainly to the east of the village.  Most of the listed buildings are houses, cottages, and associated structures.  The other listed buildings include a church, a public house, a guide post and guide stone, a farmhouse, a converted barn, a former school, and a former vicarage.


Key

Buildings

References

Citations

Sources

 

Lists of listed buildings in Derbyshire